Gianfelice "Gianni" Bonagura (27 October 1925 – 8 October 2017) was an Italian actor and voice actor.

Life and career 
Born in Milan, Bonagura was active on film, stage, television and radio. He appeared in 40 films between 1950 and 2001. He arrived at the threshold of a degree in philosophy, then in 1946 he abandoned his studies to attend the Silvio d'Amico National Academy of Dramatic Arts. Essentially a stage actor, Bonagura became popular in the second half of the fifties as a radio actor, protagonist of vignettes together with Nino Manfredi and Paolo Ferrari.  In cinema and television, he was only used as a character actor, with the exception of the role of Dr. Watson in the 1968 RAI television series Sherlock Holmes.

Bonagura also worked as a voice actor. He occasionally dubbed over the voices of Danny De Vito, Mel Brooks and Ian Holm. One of his most popular dubbing roles includes providing the Italian voice of Palpatine's alter ego, Darth Sidious in Star Wars: Episode I - The Phantom Menace. In his animated roles, he dubbed the voices of Uncle Waldo in The Aristocats and Mr. Snoops in The Rescuers.

Death
Bonagura died in Milan on 8 October 2017, 19 days before his 92nd birthday.

Selected filmography

 Against the Law (1950)
Fugitive in Trieste (1951)
Susanna Whipped Cream (1957)
The Employee (1959)
 Audace colpo dei soliti ignoti (1960)
 Behind Closed Doors (1961)
 Damon and Pythias (1962)
 Le pillole di Ercole (1962)
 I cuori infranti (1963)
 Sherlock Holmes (1968)
 In Prison Awaiting Trial (1971)
 My Darling Slave (1973)
 The Great Kidnapping (1973)
 Sex Pot (1975)
 Segni particolari: bellissimo (1983)
 I Am an ESP (1985)
 Grandi magazzini (1986)
 In the Name of the Sovereign People (1990)
 Tre colonne in cronaca (1990)
 Ferdinando and Carolina (1999)
 Padre Pio: Miracle Man (2000)

References

External links

1925 births
2017 deaths
Male actors from Milan
Accademia Nazionale di Arte Drammatica Silvio D'Amico alumni
Italian male film actors
Italian male voice actors
Italian male television actors
Italian male stage actors
Italian male radio actors
20th-century Italian male actors